Ljutvo Bugucanin is a Yugoslavian former footballer.

Balestier Central

Unofficially making his debut for Balestier Central in a friendly facing Malaysian side Perak, Bugucanin said that he wanted to stay at the Singaporean club until the cessation of his football career.

References

Year of birth missing (living people)
Living people
Expatriate footballers in Singapore
Singapore Premier League players
Association football defenders
Balestier Khalsa FC players
Serbia and Montenegro footballers